The men's discus throw event at the 1992 World Junior Championships in Athletics was held in Seoul, Korea, at Olympic Stadium on 16 and 17 September.  A 2 kg (senior implement) discus was used.

Medalists

Results

Final
17 September

Qualifications
16 Sep

Group A

Group B

Participation
According to an unofficial count, 21 athletes from 17 countries participated in the event.

References

Discus throw
Discus throw at the World Athletics U20 Championships